Three ships of the British Royal Navy have been named HMS Ivy named after the plant.

 The first Ivy was an  sloop but renamed  before her launch in 1915.
 The second  was an  launched in 1917 and sold in 1920.

References
 
U-boat net

Royal Navy ship names